The Phantom of the North, also known as Phantoms of the North, is a 1929 American drama film directed by Harry S. Webb for the independent Biltmore Productions and featuring Boris Karloff. Although the full film is now considered lost, approximately 20 minutes is known to survive and has been released on DVD by Alpha Video under the title Phantoms of the North.

Cast
 Edith Roberts as Doris Rayburn
 Donald Keith as Bob Donald
 Kathleen Key as Colette
 Boris Karloff as Jules Gregg
 Joe Bonomo as Pierre Blanc
 Josef Swickard as Colonel Rayburn
 Muro the Dog as himself
 Arab the Horse as himself

See also
 Boris Karloff filmography

References

External links

1929 films
1929 drama films
Silent American drama films
American silent feature films
American black-and-white films
Films directed by Harry S. Webb
Lost American films
1929 lost films
Lost drama films
1920s American films